Fire Music is a studio album by Archie Shepp released on Impulse! Records in 1965. "Malcolm, Malcolm Semper Malcolm" is dedicated to Malcolm X, whilst "Los Olvidados" is a homage to the film of the same name. Featured musicians include trumpeter Ted Curson, trombonist Joe Orange, alto saxophonist Marion Brown, bassist Reggie Johnson and drummer Joe Chambers.

Reception

The AllMusic review by Scott Yanow states: "This particular early Archie Shepp recording has its strong moments, although it is a bit erratic... Overall, this set, even with its faults, is recommended".

Writing for All About Jazz, Robert Gilbert called Fire Music "an often-fascinating album, rich in compositional and improvisational prowess", and commented: "Shepp puts together a record that is both challenging and accessible to most listeners... Fire Music is an album that belongs in any serious jazz fan’s collection."

Track listing
"Hambone" (Archie Shepp) – 12:29
"Los Olvidados" (Shepp) – 8:54
"Malcolm, Malcolm Semper Malcolm" (Shepp) – 4:48
"Prelude to a Kiss" (Ellington, Gordon, Mills) – 4:50
"The Girl from Ipanema" (DeMoraes, Gimbel, Jobim) – 8:36
"Hambone" [Live] – 11:53 Bonus track on CD, recorded live at the Village Gate on March 28, 1965

Personnel
Archie Shepp – tenor saxophone
Ted Curson – trumpet
Joseph Orange – trombone
Marion Brown – alto saxophone
Reggie Johnson – double bass except track 3
Joe Chambers – drums except track 3
David Izenzon – double bass on track 3
J.C. Moses – drums on track 3

References

1965 albums
Archie Shepp albums
Impulse! Records albums
Albums produced by Bob Thiele
Albums recorded at Van Gelder Studio